Eugnosta uganoa is a species of moth of the family Tortricidae. It is found in Tanzania.

References

Endemic fauna of Tanzania
Moths described in 1993
Eugnosta